The Museum of Municipal Engineering in Kraków or the Muzeum Inżynierii Miejskiej w Krakowie is a municipal museum in Kraków, Poland; located at  ul. św. Wawrzyńca 15 street in the centre of historical Kazimierz district. It consists of several buildings housing early trams, buses and motorcycles, radios, industrial machinery and early means of production, as well as many educational aids and displays. The museum is very popular with school children, but also with adults.

Notes and references

External links
 
 

Museums in Kraków
Museums established in 1998
Technology museums
Science museums in Poland